The year 2020 is the 7th year in the history of the Kunlun Fight, a kickboxing promotion based in China. The events in 2020 suffered multiple cancellations and postponements due to the COVID-19 pandemic.

The events were broadcasts through television agreements in mainland China with Jiangsu TV and around the world with various other channels. The events were also streamed live on Xigua Video. Traditionally, most Kunlun Fight events have both tournament fights and superfights (single fights).

List of events

Scheduled events

Kunlun Combat Professional League

Kunlun Fight City Hero

Cancelled and postponed events

Kunlun Fight 90

Kunlun Fight 90 was scheduled for March, 8 in Wuzhishan City, Hainan, China. The event was cancelled due to the COVID-19 pandemic.

Kunlun Fight 89

Kunlun Fight 89 was set to be held jointly with the AMMA organization on February 23 at the Hatpatong Football Stadium in Patong, Phuket, Thailand, but the Kunlun Fight portion of the event was cancelled due to the 2020 coronavirus pandemic.

2020 Kunlun Combat Professional League and Youth Fighting League seasons

The Kunlun Combat Professional League and Youth Fighting League 2020 seasons were tentatively scheduled to start in March, but the start dates for both were postponed due to the 2020 coronavirus pandemic.

See also 
2020 in Glory 
2020 in ONE Championship
2020 in K-1  
2020 in Wu Lin Feng   
2020 in Romanian kickboxing

References

Kunlun Fight
Kickboxing in China
Kunlun Fight events
Kunlun Fight
Kunlun Fight